The 2021 Danmark Rundt (officially PostNord Danmark Rundt 2021 for sponsorship reasons) was a men's road bicycle race which was held from 10 to 14 August 2021. It was the 30th edition of Danmark Rundt, which was rated as a 2.Pro event on the 2021 UCI Europe Tour and the 2021 UCI ProSeries calendars. This edition was the race's first in the UCI ProSeries; the 2020 edition was expected to feature in the inaugural UCI ProSeries but was cancelled due to the COVID-19 pandemic. The race was made up of five stages over five days and concluded with an individual time trial in the traditional finishing town of Frederiksberg.

Teams 
Six UCI WorldTeams, seven UCI ProTeams, five UCI Continental teams and the Danish national team (competing as Team Postnord Danmark) made up the nineteen teams that participated in the race. , with five riders, was the only team to not enter a full squad of seven riders. In total, 131 riders started the race, of which 105 riders finished the race.

UCI WorldTeams

 
 
 
 
 
 

UCI ProTeams

 
 
 
 
 
 
 

UCI Continental Teams

 
 
 
 
 

National Teams

 Team PostNord Danmark

Schedule

Stages

Stage 1 
10 August 2021 – Struer to Esbjerg,

Stage 2 
11 August 2021 – Ribe to Sønderborg,

Stage 3 
12 August 2021 – Tønder to Vejle,

Stage 4 
13 August 2021 – Holbæk to Kalundborg,

Stage 5 
14 August 2021 – Frederiksberg,  (ITT)

Classification leadership table 

 On stage 2, Mark Cavendish, who was second in the points classification, wore the green jersey, because first-placed Dylan Groenewegen wore the cyan jersey as the leader of the general classification. For the same reason, Giacomo Nizzolo wore the green jersey on stage 3.
 On stage 3, Jakub Kaczmarek, who was second in the active rider classification, wore the dark blue jersey, because first-placed Rasmus Bøgh Wallin wore the blue polka dot jersey as the leader of the mountains classification. For the same reason, Daniel Stampe wore the dark blue jersey on stage 4, and Emil Toudal on stage 5.
 On stages 4 and 5, Mattias Skjelmose Jensen, who was second in the young rider classification, wore the white jersey, because first-placed Remco Evenepoel wore the cyan jersey as the leader of the general classification.

Final classification standings

General classification

Points classification

Mountains classification

Young rider classification

Active rider classification

Team classification

References

External links 
 

2021
Danmark Rundt
Danmark Rundt
Danmark Rundt
Danmark Rundt